McKenzie Creek may refer to:

McKenzie Creek (Black River), a stream in Missouri
McKenzie Creek (Osage River), a stream in Missouri
McKenzie Creek (Lake Erie), a watershed administered by the Long Point Region Conservation Authority, that drains into Lake Erie